Sergey Maratovich Guriyev (/ Gwyriaty Maraty fyrt Sergej) is a Russian economist, who is provost and a professor of economics at the Instituts d'études politiques in Paris (Sciences Po). From 2016 to 2019, he was the chief economist at the European Bank for Reconstruction and Development. He was a Morgan Stanley Professor of Economics, and a rector at Moscow's New Economic School (NES) until he resigned on 30 April 2013 and fled to France.

Biography
Sergei Guriev was born to an ethnic Ossetian family, on 21 October 1971 in Vladikavkaz, North Ossetia. He received his straight As high school diploma in 1988 from Kiev Physics Mathematics High School #145. In 1993 he graduated summa cum laude from Moscow Institute of Physics and Technology with master's degrees in Economics and Computer Science, and in 1994 received his PhD in Applied Mathematics from The Russian Academy of Sciences. In 1997–98, he visited the Department of Economics at MIT for a one-year post-doctoral placement. In 2002 he received a degree of Doctor of Science in economics from The Russian Academy of Sciences. In 2003–2004 he was a Visiting Assistant Professor at the Department of Economics at Princeton University. Guriev was a speechwriter and advisor to Russian president Dmitry Medvedev, in office from May 2008 to May 2012, during which time he also sat on government advisory boards and on the boards of state enterprises.

He joined NES in 1998 focusing on research and teaching and became a full-time permanent faculty member in 1999. He became the school's Rector in 2004. He was also teaching graduate courses in economics of development, microeconomic theory and contract theory.

Departure from Russia
Guriev left Russia on 30 April 2013 after a "frightening and humiliating interrogation" as government investigators searched his office and secured 5 years of his emails due to his activities in a panel of economical experts who critically assessed Russian position in the Yukos case. In 2015 Vladimir Putin denied that Guriev's departure "could have been related to any activities of the authorities".

Awards
In 2001, Sergei Guriev was announced the Best Academic Manager in Social Sciences by the Science Support Foundation. In 2000 and 2005, he was awarded a gold medal for Best Research in Development Economics by the Global Development Network. In 2006, he was selected a Young Global Leader by the World Economic Forum. In 2009, he received the Second Prize Medal for Research on Foreign Direct Investment and Natural Resources, the Global Development Network (GDN), Ninth Annual Awards Competition. He was also selected into the Top 100 of the President of Russian Federation Reserve of Management Cadre.

Professional activities

Guriev's primary interests are in contract theory, corporate governance, labor mobility, political economics, economics of development and transition. His work has been published in international refereed journals, including the American Economic Review, the Journal of the European Economic Association, the Journal of Economic Perspectives, the Economic Journal and the American Political Science Review. He ran a monthly column in Forbes Russia (in 2006–2013) and a biweekly column for the leading Russian business daily Vedomosti (in 2003–2013). He has also contributed numerous columns in the New York Times, the Financial Times, the Washington Post, Project Syndicate, and the Moscow Times, among others.

In 2008–2012 he was a member of President of Russia's Council on Science, Education and Technology, in 2010-12 he was a member of the President of Russia's Commission on the National Projects, in 2012–2013 he was a member of Government of Russia's Commission on Open Government (2012–2013).

Guriev is a Research Affiliate at the Centre for Economic Policy Research (CEPR), London. He is also a Co-Editor of the Economics of Transition, and a Panel Member of the Economic Policy. He is a member of Scientific Council of Bruegel think tank, member of the International Advisory Council of the Peterson Institute for International Council, member of the International Advisory Board of the Blavatnik School of Governance at Oxford University, member of the Strategic Council of the School of Public Affairs at Sciences Po, Paris.

He is also the President-Elect of the Society for the Institutional and Organizational Economics (formerly the International Society for the New Institutional Economics).

Board memberships
Sergei Guriev has been a board member at Sberbank (2008–2014), Agency for Home Mortgage Lending (2008–2013), Russian Agricultural Bank (2008–2009), Alfa Strakhovanie Insurance Company (2009–2013), Russian Venture Company (2009–2013, board chair in 2012–2013), E.ON Russia (2013–2014), and of the Dynasty Foundation (2007–2015, board chair in 2011–2013).

In 2009 and 2010 he received the Independent Director of the Year prize from Russia's National Association of Independent Directors. In 2010, he received a Certificate in Company Directorship from the UK Institute of Directors and was voted the Best Independent Director by the Association of Managers of Russia and the Russian Institute of Directors.

In 2015–2019 Guriev was the chief economist at the European Bank for Reconstruction and Development.

Selected publications
 Sergei Guriev, Daniel Treisman. (2022). Spin Dictators: The Changing Face of Tyranny in the 21st Century. Princeton University Press.
 Sergei Guriev, Nikita Melnikov and Ekaterina Zhuravskaya. (2021) “3G Internet and Confidence in Government”. Forthcoming, Quarterly Journal of Economics.
 Guriev, Sergei and Mikhail Klimenko (2015). "Duration and Term Structure of Trade Agreements". Forthcoming, Economic Journal.
 Guriev, Sergei and Elena Vakulenko (2015). Breaking Out of Poverty Traps: Internal Migration and Interregional Convergence in Russia. Forthcoming, Journal of Comparative Economics.
 Bhattacharya, Sudipto, and Sergei Guriev (2013). “Control rights over intellectual property”. Journal of Industrial Economics, LXI(3), 564–591.
 Friebel, Guido, and Sergei Guriev (2012). “Earnings manipulation and incentives in firms”. Journal of Economics and Management Strategy, 21(4), 1007–1027.
 Kolotilin, Anton, Sergei Guriev, and Konstantin Sonin (2011). “Determinants of Expropriation in the Oil Sector: A Theory and Evidence from Panel Data”. Journal of Law, Economics, and Organization, 27(2), 301–323.
 Guriev, Sergei, Evgeny Yakovlev and Ekaterina Zhuravskaya (2010). “Interest Group Politics in a Federation”. Journal of Public Economics, 94(9–10), 730–748.
 Egorov, Georgy, Sergei Guriev, and Konstantin Sonin (2009). “Why Resource-Poor Dictators Allow Freer Media: A Theory and Evidence from Panel Data”. American Political Science Review, 103(4), 645–668.
 Guriev, Sergei, and Dmitriy Kvasov (2009). "Imperfect competition in financial markets and capital structure." Journal of Economic Behavior and Organization, 72(1), 131–146.
 Guriev, Sergei, and Ekaterina Zhuravskaya (2009). “(Un)Happiness in Transition”. Journal of Economic Perspectives, 23(2), 143–168.
 Guriev, Sergei and Konstantin Sonin. “Dictators and Oligarchs: A Dynamic Theory of Contested Property Rights”. Journal of Public Economics, 93, 1–13.
 Friebel, Guido, Sergei Guriev, Russell Pittman, Elizaveta Shevyakhova, Anna Tomova (2007). “Railroad Restructuring in Russia and Central and Eastern Europe: One Solution for All Problems?” Transport Reviews, 27(3), 251–271.
 Bhattacharya, Sudipto, and Sergei Guriev (2006). “Knowledge disclosure, patents and the optimal organization of R&D”. Journal of European Economic Association, 4(6), 1112–1147.
 Friebel, Guido, and Sergei Guriev (2006). “Smuggling humans: A theory of debt-financed migration”. Journal of European Economic Association, 4(6), 1085–1111.
 Guriev, Sergei, and Dmitriy Kvasov (2005). “Contracting on time”. American Economic Review, 5(5), 1369–1385.
 Friebel, Guido, and Sergei Guriev (2005). "Should I stay or can I go: attachment of workers through in-kind payments", World Bank Economic Review, 19(2), 175–202.
 Guriev, Sergei, and Andrei Rachinsky (2005). “The Role of Oligarchs in Russian Capitalism”. Journal of Economic Perspectives, Winter 2005, 131–150.
 Guriev, Sergei (2004). “Red tape and corruption”. Journal of Development Economics 73(2), 489–504.
 Guriev, Sergei, and Dmitriy Kvasov (2004). “Barter for price discrimination”. International Journal of Industrial Organization, 22(3), 329–350.
 Andrienko, Yuri, and Sergei Guriev (2004). “Determinants of Interregional Labor Mobility in Russia”. Economics of Transition 12(1), 1–27.
 Guriev, Sergei (2003). “Incomplete Contracts with Cross-Investments”. Contributions to Theoretical Economics, Berkeley Electronic Journals on Theoretical Economics, 3(1), Article 5.
 Guriev, Sergei, Igor Makarov and Mathilde Maurel (2002). “Debt Overhang and Barter in Russia”. Journal of Comparative Economics, 30(4), 635–656.
 Guriev, Sergei (2001). “On Microfoundations of Yaari’s Dual Theory of Choice”. Geneva Papers on Risk and Insurance Theory, 26(2), 117–137.

References

External links

Living people
Ossetian people
Russian economists
Echo of Moscow radio presenters
Moscow Institute of Physics and Technology alumni
People from Vladikavkaz
Russian emigrants to France
1971 births
Russian activists against the 2022 Russian invasion of Ukraine